Seyyed Ali Shafiei (born 1940 in Dezful, resident in Ahwaz) is an Iranian Twelver Shia scholar, who is a member of Assembly of Experts from Khuzestan province. He is a/the son of Seyyed Mohammad Reza (Shafiei) who was from the known Islamic scholars of Khuzestan. Seyyed Ali Shafiei commenced his educations from Maktabkhaneh (Kuttab), and began to peruse Quran and Islamic issues. Afterwards, he entered a new school. Later on, he went to educate Hawzah lessons in the city of Ahwaz. Then, Seyyed-Ali departed to the Seminary of Najaf, in Iraq. After Najaf, he came back to Ahwaz; and was appointed as a/the Imam of Jama'ah in Ahwaz, and commenced to promote Islamic rulings.

Seyyed Ali who has reached to the (Islamic) scientific degree of Ijtihad, used to teach Islamic-science and ... for the members of Islamic Revolutionary Guard Corps (IRCG) and other organizations; and was also active in combating against the regime of the Shah. This Shia ayatollah, was appointed by the first/former supreme leader of Iran, Seyyed Ruhollah Khomeini in a 17-member-mission to settle the affairs of Ahwaz, after the Islamic revolution of Iran. Since many years ago, he is the "Imam of Jama'ah" at the mosque of Shafiei in the center of Ahwaz which is considered among the oldest mosques of the city. Shafaei  has compiled several works, such as:
 Fatimah Yadeh Nabowat
 Sharhe Mokhtasare Zendeganie Allameh Feize Kashani
 Az Gushe Va Kenare Tarikh (Barresie Safhei Az Zendegie Emam Hassan Mojtaba)
 Dars-haee Az Jahade Eslami
 Velayate Por Foruqe Ali
 Majlese Shouraye Eslami Va Tasvibe Ahkame Sanavieh
 Taqvime Sa'ate Shareie Ostane Khuzestan
 Namaz Darse Zendegi
 Chahar Goftar
 Marjaeiate Ayatollah Khamenei
 Raveshe Feqhi Va Osulie Sheikhe Azame Ansari
 Vahdate Marjaeiat Va Rahbari
 Nezame Velayate Faqih
 Moqadamate Akhlaqe Eslami
 Al-Ehtekar
Etc.

Teachers 
Seyyed Ali Shafiei who was/is active in the fields of research, teaching, authorship, lecturing and Tafsir (interpretation) of the Qur'an, applied several known teachers and scholars during his studies period; amongst of them are:
 Mohammad-Ali Ardebili
 Kazem Tabrizi
 Moslem Malakouti
 Madani Tabrizi
 Qolam-Reza Saeidi Kashmari
 Seyyed Mohammad-Jafar Mosavi Moravej
 Seyyed Abu al-Qasim al-Khoei
 Hakim
 Seyyed Ruhollah Khomeini
 Baqer Zanjani
 Mohammad-Ali Moezi Dezfuli
 Seyyed Ali Behbahani
Etc.

See also

 Assembly of Experts
 Mohammad Ali Mousavi Jazayeri
 Sayyid Abdul-Nabi Mousavi Fard

References 

Iranian Islamists
Shia Islamists
1940 births
Living people
Members of the Assembly of Experts for Constitution
Iranian ayatollahs
People from Dezful
People from Ahvaz
People from Khuzestan Province